The 1963 Valley State Matadors football team represented San Fernando Valley State College—now known as California State University, Northridge—as a member of the California Collegiate Athletic Association (CCAA) during the 1963 NCAA College Division football season. Led by second-year head coach Sam Winningham, Valley State compiled an overall record of 2–6 with a mark of 0–3 in conference play, placing last out of six teams in the CCAA. The Matadors played home games at Monroe High School in Sepulveda, California.

Schedule

Notes

References

Valley State
Cal State Northridge Matadors football seasons
Valley State Matadors football